The 2019–20 Lebanese Premier League was intended to be the 59th season of the Lebanese Premier League, the top Lebanese professional league for association football clubs, since its establishment in 1934.

Ahed were the three-time defending champions. Bourj and Shabab Bourj joined as the promoted clubs from the 2018–19 Lebanese Premier League. They replaced Bekaa and Racing, who were relegated to the 2019–20 Lebanese Second Division.

On 21 January 2020, the LFA decided to suspend all football leagues until further notice, and cancelled the three match days that were previously played (the last one being on 17 October 2019), due to the ongoing economic crisis and the impending arrival of the coronavirus pandemic. The season was officially cancelled on 28 May 2020.

Summary 
Starting from the 2019–20 season, all teams in the Lebanese Premier League and Lebanese Second Division had to involve a certain number of under-22 players in both the league and the Lebanese FA Cup, with a minimum of 1,000 minutes for one player, a minimum of 1,500 aggregate minutes for two players and a minimum of 2,000 aggregate minutes for three players. In case a club were to not meet the required number of minutes at the end of the season, they would have had three points deducted from their total in the league.

On 30 July 2019, the Lebanese Football Association announced a three-year deal with German sportswear company Jako for €120,000, with the Jako Match 2.0 becoming the league's official match ball starting from the 2019–20 season.

Due to political and financial issues in the country, the LFA decided to suspend all football leagues until further notice on 21 January 2020, and cancelled the three match days that were previously played (the last one being on 17 October 2019). With the COVID-19 pandemic also stopping sporting activities globally, the season was officially cancelled on 28 May 2020.

Teams 

Twelve teams were due to compete in the league – the top ten teams from the previous season and the two teams promoted from the Second Division. The promoted teams were Bourj (returning to the top flight after a 16-year absence) and Shabab Bourj (promoted for the first time in their history). They replaced Bekaa and Racing, ending their top flight spells of five and eleven years respectively.

Stadiums and locations 

Prior to the start of each season, every team chooses two stadiums as their home venues. In case both stadiums are unavailable for a certain matchday, another venue is used.

Note: Table lists in alphabetical order.

Personnel and kits

Foreign players 
Lebanese clubs are allowed to have three foreign players at their disposal at any time, as well as one extra Palestinian player born in Lebanon. Moreover, each club competing in an AFC competition is allowed to field one extra foreign player, to be only played in continental matches, as the AFC allows four foreign players to play in the starting eleven (one of whom from an AFC country).

 Players in bold have been registered during the mid-season transfer window.
 Players in italics have left the club during the mid-season transfer window,.

League table at abandonment

Notes

References

External links 

 Official website
 RSSSF

Lebanese Premier League seasons
Lebanon
1
Lebanese Premier League